The Trowbridge House is a historic building located in Washington, D.C., that  is being renovated to serve as a presidential residence, specifically for the use of former presidents of the United States while visiting the capital city. The only US government residential facility currently dedicated for use by former presidents is the Presidential Townhouse.

Constructed in 1859 as the residence of William P. Trowbridge, Trowbridge sold the house in 1869 and, in the early 20th century, it was leased by the United States government for use as office space. The government ultimately purchased the building in 1950 and, over the following decades, it housed the offices of the Commission of Fine Arts, and from 1989 to 1993 The President.’s Drug Advisory Council. Later the White House Millennium Council, Psychological Strategy Board, Operations Coordinating Board, White House Office of Women's Initiatives and Outreach, and White House Office of Faith-Based and Community Initiatives.

Trowbridge House abuts the President's Guest House (Blair House) on its south side and 712 Jackson Place, which houses the Harry S. Truman Scholarship Foundation, on the north.

See also
 Camp David
 White House

References

External links
 

Buildings of the United States government in Washington, D.C.
Houses completed in 1859